Dynamite Steps is the fifth full-length album by Greg Dulli's The Twilight Singers. It was released on February 14, 2011, worldwide, and a day later in the United States via Sub Pop on CD and double 12" white-colored vinyl.

The Sub Pop pre-order for Dynamite Steps includes a two-track CD-R featuring two unreleased Twilight Singers tracks, "Don't Call" and "Ballad of Pure Thought". The band marked the album's release with in-store performances at Amoeba Music on February 15, 2011, (Los Angeles) and February 17, 2011, (San Francisco).

The band performed the first single "On the Corner" on Jimmy Kimmel Live! and the Late Show with David Letterman.

Track listing
 "Last Night in Town" – 4:44
 "Be Invited" – 3:15
 "Waves" – 4:02
 "Get Lucky" – 4:12
 "On the Corner" – 4:26
 "Gunshots" – 3:43
 "She Was Stolen" – 3:15
 "Blackbird and the Fox" – 2:53
 "Never Seen No Devil" – 3:02
 "The Beginning of the End" – 3:15
 "Dynamite Steps" – 6:45

Personnel 
 Greg Dulli – vocals (all songs), guitar (1, 2, 3, 4, 6, 8, 9, 10), piano (1, 2, 5, 6, 7), synth bass (1, 3), mellotron (1), bass (2), drums (2, 10, 11), Rhodes (3, 5, 10, 11), electric guitar (7), Prophet (7)
 Joseph Arthur – vocals (6, 9), harmonica (9)
 Joshua Blanchard – dobro (9)
 Ani DiFranco – vocals (8)
 Amy Farris – violin/viola/cello (4)
 Scott Ford – bass (1, 3, 4, 5, 6, 7, 8, 9, 11), vocals (4)
 Petra Haden – violin (4, 9), vocals (9)
 David Henderson – drums (1)
 Chris Jordan – piano (4)
 Mark Lanegan – vocals (2)
 Leta Lucy – vocals (10, 11)
 Nick McCabe – guitar (2)
 Steve Nalepa – synth (1), strings (7)
 Mike Napolitano – timpani (7)
 Rick G. Nelson – violin (2, 8), cello (8)
 Dave Rosser – guitar (1, 3, 4, 5, 6, 8, 9, 10, 11), vocals (1, 3, 4, 6, 8), acoustic guitar (7)
 Carina Round – vocals (10)
 Mathias Schneeberger – guitar solo (1), guitar (5), bass (9)
 Jon Skibic – guitar (1, 10, 11), bass (10)
 Cully Symington – drums (3, 4, 7, 8)
 Gene Trautmann – drums (5)
 Greg Wieczorek – drums (6, 9, 11), vocals (6), percussion (9)

References

The Twilight Singers albums
2011 albums
Sub Pop albums
Albums produced by Greg Dulli